Diacholotis iopyrrha is a moth of the family Agonoxenidae. It is found in Costa Rica.

References

Moths described in 1937
Agonoxeninae
Moths of Central America